Luke 17 is the seventeenth chapter of the Gospel of Luke in the New Testament of the Christian Bible. It records the teachings of Jesus Christ and the healing of ten lepers. The book containing this chapter is anonymous, but early Christian tradition uniformly affirmed that Luke the Evangelist composed this Gospel as well as the Acts of the Apostles.

The New King James Version divides this chapter into four sections, headed respectively "Jesus Warns of Offences" (verses 1–4), "Faith and Duty" (verses 5–10), "Ten Lepers Cleansed" (verses 11–19) and "The Coming of the Kingdom" (verses 20–37). Commenting on the variety of topics covered in the first ten verses, Lutheran biblical writer Harold Buls states that he "assumes that there is logical sequence. The items are not merely picked or chosen by Luke from some outside source".

Text
The original text was written in Koine Greek. This chapter is divided into 37 verses.

Textual witnesses
Some early manuscripts containing the text of this chapter are:
Papyrus 75 (175–225)
Papyrus 111 (3rd-century)
Codex Vaticanus (325–350)
Codex Sinaiticus (330–360)
Codex Bezae (~400)
Codex Washingtonianus (~400)
Codex Alexandrinus (400–440).

Offences and forgiving of offences (17:1–10)
Verses 1–10 are presented as a single unit in the New International Version.

Verse 1
Then He [Jesus] said to the disciples, "It is impossible that no offenses should come, but woe to him through whom they do come!"
Jesus warns of "offences" coming, literally "stumbling blocks" (skandala). Other translations used are "obstacles" (Jerusalem Bible), "things that cause people to sin" (Buls) and "temptations to sin" (English Standard Version). Reflecting on Jesus' assertion that something might be "impossible", Lutheran Pietist Johann Bengel offers as alternative readings, "it is not a thing usual to happen" or "a thing not admissible in the common course of things", noting similarly that at  Jesus had said that "it is impossible for a prophet to be killed outside of Jerusalem".

Verse 2
 It would be better for him if a millstone were hung around his neck, and he were thrown into the sea, than that he should offend one of these little ones.
The "little ones" are the more vulnerable members of the community of disciples. The terms appears more frequently in Matthew's gospel than in Luke's.

Verses 3b–4
If your brother sins against you, rebuke him; and if he repents, forgive him. And if he sins against you seven times in a day, and seven times in a day returns to you, saying, 'I repent', you shall forgive him.
The Jerusalem Bible suggests that "Luke, apparently, is thinking of a matter that concerns only two of the community". Matthew 18 refers to a process of appealing to the community, which is missing from Luke's writing on this subject.

Verse 5
And the apostles said to the Lord, "Increase our faith".
Having previously addressed "the disciples" (Luke 16:1 and ), Jesus speaks now to the apostles, who come to him "with a special request". They feel that the moral strength of their faith in Jesus, i.e. just the loving power of their faith, is not great enough for that great task of forgiveness" which has just set for them in the previous verse: Their request is for "stronger energetic faith", better in quality rather than quantitatively more.

Cleansing ten lepers (17:11–19)

This is one of the miracles of Jesus in the Gospels (recorded only in the Gospel of Luke). On his way to Jerusalem, Jesus traveled along the border between Samaria and Galilee. As he was going into a village, ten men who had leprosy met him. They stood at a distance and called out in a loud voice, "Jesus, Master, have pity on us!" When he saw them, he said: "Go, show yourselves to the priests." And as they went, they were cleansed. One of them, when he saw he was healed, came back, praising God in a loud voice. He threw himself at Jesus' feet and thanked him—and he was a Samaritan. Jesus asked: "Were not all ten cleansed? Where are the other nine? Was no one found to return and give praise to God except this foreigner?" 
Then he said to him: "Rise and go; your faith has saved you."

This miracle has been described as emphasising the importance of faith, for Jesus did not say: "My power has saved you" but attributed the healing to the faith of the beneficiaries.

The coming of the kingdom (17:20–21)

Verse 20
Now when He was asked by the Pharisees when the kingdom of God would come, He answered them and said, "The kingdom of God does not come with observation;"

Verse 21
Neither shall they say, Lo here! or, lo there! for, behold, the kingdom of God is within you.

Buls notes that the Pharisees' question is a 'when?' question whereas Jesus' answer is a 'what?' response: the Pharisees "were expecting the Kingdom of God ... to come soon"; this is "a faulty notion about the character of the Kingdom". Jesus replies that the Kingdom of God does not come "with observation" or "with a visible display": the word  (paratērēseōs, careful observation) appears only here in the New Testament.

The day of the Son of Man (17:22–37)
Luke handles the "end of time" in a different manner from Matthew, whose "discourse on the end times" makes use of similar material. Luke makes a clear distinction between Jesus' prophecy of the destruction of Jerusalem (see ) and his own coming in glory at the end of time.

See also 
 Leper
 Lot
 Ministry of Jesus
 Miracles of Jesus
 Noah
 Samaritan
 The Kingdom of God is Within You
 Other related Bible parts: Genesis 6, Genesis 7, Genesis 19, Leviticus 14, 2 Kings 5, Matthew 24

References

External links 
 King James Bible – Wikisource
English Translation with Parallel Latin Vulgate
Online Bible at GospelHall.org (ESV, KJV, Darby, American Standard Version, Bible in Basic English)
Multiple bible versions at Bible Gateway (NKJV, NIV, NRSV etc.)

Gospel of Luke chapters